Allan M. Collins is an American cognitive scientist, Professor Emeritus of Learning Sciences at Northwestern University's School of Education and Social Policy. His research is recognized as having broad impact on the fields of cognitive psychology, artificial intelligence, and education.

Research contributions

Psychology
Collins is most well known in psychology for his foundational research on human semantic memory and cognition. Collins and colleagues, most notably M.R. Quillian and Elizabeth Loftus, developed the position that semantic knowledge is represented in stored category representations, linked together in a taxonomically organized processing hierarchy (see semantic networks). Support for their models came from a classic series of reaction-time experiments on human question answering.

Artificial intelligence
In artificial intelligence, Collins is recognized for work on intelligent tutoring systems and plausible reasoning. With collaborator Jaime Carbonell, Collins produced the first documented example of an intelligent tutor system called SCHOLAR CAI (computer-assisted instruction). Knowledge in SCHOLAR was structured analogously to the then theorized organization of human semantic memory as to afford a variety of meaningful interactions with the system. Collins' extensive research program pioneered discourse analysis methods to study the strategies human tutors use to adapt their teaching to learners. In addition, Collins studied and developed a formal theory characterizing the variety of plausible inferences people use to ask questions about which their knowledge is incomplete. Importantly, Collins developed methods to embed lessons learned from such research into the SCHOLAR system, improving system usability and effectiveness. Subsequently, Collins developed WHY, an intelligent tutoring system that used the Socratic method for tutoring causal knowledge and reasoning. In conjunction with this project he developed a formal computational theory of Socratic tutoring, derived from analyses of inquiry teaching dialogues.

Education
As a cognitive scientist and foundational member of the field of the learning sciences, Collins has influenced several strands of educational research and development. Building upon his work on intelligent tutoring systems, he has conducted numerous projects investigating the use of technology in schools and developing educational technologies for assessing and improving student learning. Collins has gradually shifted towards the situated cognition view of knowledge being embedded in the activity, context, and culture in which it is developed and used. In response to conventional practices that often ignore the influence of culture and activity, Collins and colleagues have developed and studied cognitive apprenticeship as an effective alternative educational practice. In addition, Collins was among the first to advocate for and outline design-based research methodologies in education.

Education and professional appointments
B. A., University of Michigan, 1959 (Accounting)
M. A., University of Michigan, 1961 (Communication Sciences)
Ph. D., University of Michigan, 1970 (Cognitive Psychology)
Senior Scientist, BBN Technologies, 1967 - 1982
Principal Scientist, BBN Technologies, 1982 - 2000
Professor, Education & Social Policy, Northwestern University, 1989 - 2005
Co-director, U. S. Department of Education's Center for Technology in Education, 1991 - 1994
Research Professor, School of Education, Boston College, 1998 - 2002
Visiting Scholar, Harvard Graduate School of Education, 2001 - 2005
Visiting Senior Lecturer, Harvard Graduate School of Education, 2005 - 2006
Professor Emeritus, Education & Social Policy, Northwestern University, 2005–present

Academic honors and service
National Academy of Education, Elected Member
Association for the Advancement of Artificial Intelligence, Inaugural Fellow, 1990
American Educational Research Association, Inaugural Fellow, 2008 
John Simon Guggenheim Memorial Foundation fellowship, 1974
Sloan fellowship
Founding chair of the Cognitive Science Society, 1979 - 1980
Board member of the Cognitive Science Society, 1980 - 1987
Founding editor, Cognitive Science, 1976 - 1980
Editorial board, Cognitive Science, 1980 - 2000
Editorial board, Discourse Processes, 1977 - 1987
Editorial board, Cognition and Instruction, 1981–present
Editorial board, Journal of the Learning Sciences, 1990–present

Major publications
Collins, A. M., & Quillian, M. R. (1969). Retrieval Time from Semantic Memory. Journal of Verbal Learning and Verbal Behavior, 8, 240–247. (citation classic)
Collins, A. M., & Loftus, E. F. (1975). A Spreading Activation Theory of Semantic Processing. Psychological Review, 82, 407–428. (citation classic)

Collins A. M., Brown J. S., & Newman S. (1989). Cognitive Apprenticeship: Teaching the Craft of Reading, Writing, and Mathematics, in Knowing, Learning and Instruction: Essays in Honor of Robert Glaser, edited by LB Resnick, Lawrence Erlbaum, Hillsdale, NJ. 

Collins, A. M. (1992). Towards a design science of education. In E. Scanlon & T. O’Shea (Eds.), New directions in educational technology (pp. 15–22). Berlin: Springer.

Greeno, J., Collins, A. M., & Resnick, L. (1996). Cognition and learning. (pp. 15–46) In D. Berliner and R. Calfee (Eds.), Handbook of Educational Psychology. New York: Macmillan.
Bielaczyc, K. & Collins, A. M. (1999). Learning communities in classrooms: A reconceptualization of educational practice. In Reigeluth, C. M. (Ed), Instructional-design Theories and Models: A New Paradigm of Instructional Theory : 269–292. 

Collins, A. & Halverson, R. (2009): Rethinking Education in the Age of Technology: The Digital Revolution and Schooling in America. New York: Teachers College Press.

References

External links
 Allan M. Collin's departmental website

Living people
Ross School of Business alumni
Year of birth missing (living people)
Educational psychologists
Artificial intelligence researchers
Northwestern University faculty
Boston College faculty
Harvard University staff
Sloan Research Fellows
Fellows of the Cognitive Science Society
American educational psychologists